Allen Jones may refer to:

Allen Jones (Continental Congress) (1739–1798), Continental Congress delegate
Allen Jones (artist) (born 1937), British pop artist
Allen Jones (record producer) (1940–1987), American record producer
A.J. Styles (Allen Jones, born 1977), professional wrestler
Allen Jones (whistleblower), Pennsylvania whistleblower on the pharmaceutical industry

See also
Allan Jones (disambiguation)
Alan Jones (disambiguation)
Alun Jones (disambiguation)
Al Jones (disambiguation)
Jones (surname), a surname of Medieval English origins
List of people with surname Jones